The 2020 Illinois Truck & Equipment Allen Crowe 100 was the 19th stock car race of the 2020 ARCA Menards Series and the 38th iteration of the event. The race was held on Sunday, October 4, 2020, in Springfield, Illinois at the Illinois State Fairgrounds Racetrack, a 1 mile (1.6 km) permanent clay oval-shaped track at the Illinois State Fair. The race was extended from its scheduled 100 laps to 103 laps due to a NASCAR overtime finish. At race's end, a dominating Ryan Unzicker of Hendren Motorsports would hold off the field on the final restart to win his first and to date, final career ARCA Menards Series win and his first and only win of the season. To fill out the podium, Hailie Deegan of DGR-Crosley and Bret Holmes of Bret Holmes Racing would finish second and third respectively.

Background 
Illinois State Fairgrounds Racetrack is a one mile long clay oval motor racetrack on the Illinois State Fairgrounds in Springfield, the state capital. It is frequently nicknamed The Springfield Mile. Constructed in the late 19th century and reconstructed in 1927, the track has hosted competitive auto racing since 1910, making it one of the oldest speedways in the United States. The original mile track utilized the current frontstretch and the other side was behind the current grandstands and the straightaways were connected by tight turns. It is the oldest track to continually host national championship dirt track racing, holding its first national championship race in 1934 under the American Automobile Association banner. It is the home of five world records for automobile racing, making it one of the fastest dirt tracks in the world. Since 1993, the venue is managed by Bob Sargent's Track Enterprises.

Entry list 

*Withdrew.

Practice 
The only 30-minute practice session was held on Sunday, October 4.

Qualifying 
Qualifying was held on Sunday, October 4, at 11:30 AM EST. Each driver would have two laps to set a fastest time; the fastest of the two would count as their official qualifying lap.

The pole was Unzicker's first.

Race results

References 

2020 ARCA Menards Series
October 2020 sports events in the United States
2020 in sports in Illinois